Sedalia is an unincorporated community in Owen Township, Clinton County, Indiana, United States.

History
Sedalia was platted March 31, 1873 by James A. Campbell and Jackson B. McCune and was named after Sedalia, Illinois, the home town of an official of the Vandalia Railroad.  McCune built the first house and was the first postmaster.  William Miller operated the first store, Allen Branch was the first blacksmith, and Dr. Keeny the first physician.

Geography
Sedalia is located at  along State Road 26, half a mile east of State Road 75.

Gallery

References

External links

Unincorporated communities in Clinton County, Indiana
Unincorporated communities in Indiana
1873 establishments in Indiana